Calophyllum bracteatum is a species of flowering plant in the Calophyllaceae family. It is found in Sri Lanka where it is known as ගුරු කින (guru kina) by local people.

Trunk
Bark - young smooth, mature rough, deeply fissured, lenticellate, bright yellow-orange; Immature Bark - beefy red; clear exudate.

Uses
fruit - edible.

References
 
 http://www.fs.fed.us/global/iitf/Calophyllumcalaba.pdf
 
 http://www.memidex.com/calophyllum-calaba

Endemic flora of Sri Lanka
calaba